Apollo 18 (Hangul: 아폴로18) is a South Korean indie rock trio formed in June 2008 by Daeinn Kim (김대인), Hyunseok Choi (최현석), and Sangyun Lee (이상윤).

Apollo 18 won the "Hello Rookie" prize for South Korea's most promising young act of 2009, and the "Rookie of the Year" award at the 2010 Korean Music Awards.

History 

 2008 - Formation
 2009 - [Red] Album Release
 2009 - [Blue] Album Release
 2009 - Pentaport Rock Festival
 2009 - Jisan Valley Rock Festival
 2009 - EBS Space Gong-Gam, Hello Rookie of August 
 2009 - Best New Indie Musician selected by Korea Creative Content Agency (Kocca)
 2009 - Zankyo Record 5th ANNIVERSARY Festival
 2009 - 2009 EBS Hello Rookie Awards, Grand Prize
 2010 - [Red](extended edition) & [Violet] Album Release
 2010 - Korean Music Award, Rookie Awad
 2010 - TV Show : invitation to the trance' exclusively at EBS Space Gong Gam
 2010 - Green Plugged Festival
 2010 - First Exclusive Concert in Korea 'No Human'
 2010 - Nationwide Tour in Korea
 2010 - Jisan Valley Rock Festival (Seoul, Korea)
 2010 - Exclusive Concert in Jeju Island
 2010 - EBS Hello Rookie Awards
 2011 - SXSW (Texas, US)
 2011 - Jisan Valley Rock Festival
 2011 - Fuji Rock Festival (Niigata, Japan)
 2011 - Stepping Stone Festival (Jeju Island, Korea)
 2011 - Beastie Rock Festival (Taipei, Taiwan)
 2011 - [BLACK] EP Album Release
 2012 – 2nd Exclusive Concert 'Apollo 18 in Blackhole'
 2012 – 2012 Korean Music Awards, Nominated Best Rock 'Sonic Boom'
 2012 – Red, Blue, Violet Series Album Reissue
 2012 – MTV Iggy Artist of the Week
 2012 – Blonde Redhead Live in Korea's Opening Guest
 2012 – Jisan Valley Rock Festival (Seoul, Korea)
 2012 – Pop Montreal Festival & Canada Tour (Toronto/Ottawa/Montreal, Canada)
 2013 – Liverpool Sound City (Liverpool, UK)
 2013 – Focus Wales (Wales, UK)
 2013 – CITYBREAK (Seoul, Korea)
 2013 – V-ROX Festival (Vladivostok, Russia)
 2013 – Beastie Rock Festival (Taipei, Taiwan)
 2013 – Canal Kylin International Music Festival (Beijing, China)
 2015 – Sound of the Xity (Beijing, China)
 2015 – Strawberry Music Festival (Shanghai, China)

Discography 

 The Red Album – debut EP (2009)
 [0] / The Blue Album (2009)
 Red (enhanced reissue) (2010)
 The Violet Album – EP (2010)
 The Black Album – EP (2011)

References

External links 
 Apollo 18 band official web site
 Apollo 18 bio at the 2011 SXSW festival.

South Korean rock music groups
Musical groups established in 2008